Metarctia sheljuzhkoi is a moth of the subfamily Arctiinae. It was described by Sergius G. Kiriakoff in 1961. It is found in Ivory Coast.

References

 

Endemic fauna of Ivory Coast
Metarctia
Moths described in 1961